The Hajipur–Muzaffarpur–Samastipur–Barauni section is a railway line connecting  to  via Muzaffarpur, Samastipur the Indian state of Bihar. The  line passes through the plains of North Bihar and the Gangetic Plain in Bihar.

References

5 ft 6 in gauge railways in India
Railway lines opened in 1886
Transport in Hajipur